The Chernock Baronetcy of Holcot (Hulcote), Bedfordshire was created in the Baronetage of England on 21 May 1661 for St John Chernock.

Chernock baronets, of Holcot (1661)

 Sir St John Chernock, 1st Baronet (–1680) 	– He married Audrey Villiers, daughter of Sir William Villiers, 1st Baronet.
 Sir Villiers Chernock, 2nd Baronet (c.1641–1694) – MP for Bedfordshire (1685–1687). High Sheriff of Bedfordshire in 1680.
 Sir Pynsent Chernock, 3rd Baronet (by 1670–1734) – MP for Bedfordshire (1705–1708) and (1713–1715). High Sheriff of Bedfordshire in 1703.
 Sir Boteler Chernock, 4th Baronet (1696–1756) 	– MP for Bedford (1740–1747)
 Sir Villiers Chernock, 5th Baronet (died 1779)    – Baronetcy extinct on his death.

References

Extinct baronetcies in the Baronetage of England